Synchronized swimming at the 2000 Summer Olympics was held in the Olympic Aquatic Centre where 104 competitors challenged for 2 gold medals in the duet and team events. Each event was made up of a technical and free routine with the points added together to determine the medalists.

Medal summary

Medal table

References
Official Olympic Report

 
2000 Summer Olympics events
2000
2000 in synchronized swimming
Synchronised swimming competitions in Australia
International aquatics competitions hosted by Australia